Caladenia pholcoidea subsp. pholcoidea, commonly known as the Albany spider orchid, is a plant in the orchid family Orchidaceae and is endemic to the south-west of Western Australia. It has a single hairy leaf and up to four pale yellow flowers with long drooping petals and lateral sepals.

Description
The sepals and petals have long, brown, drooping, thread-like tips. There are four or more rows of pink calli along the centre of the labellum. Flowering occurs from November to early January.

Taxonomy and naming
Caladenia pholcoidea was first described in 2001 by Stephen Hopper and Andrew Phillip Brown and the description was published in Nuytsia. At the same time they described two subspecies, including subspecies pholcoidea. The specific epithet (pholcoidea) refers to the similarity of the flowers to the common spider Pholcus phalangioides. The suffix -oidea means "likeness" in Latin.

Distribution and habitat
The Albany spider orchid is found between Albany and Augusta in the Esperance Plains, Jarrah Forest and Warren biogeographic regions where it usually grows around the edges of winter-wet swamps.

Conservation
Caladenia pholcoidea subsp. pholcoidea  is classified as "not threatened" by the Western Australian Government Department of Parks and Wildlife.

References

pholcoidea
Endemic orchids of Australia
Orchids of Western Australia
Plants described in 2001
Taxa named by Stephen Hopper
Taxa named by Andrew Phillip Brown